Prietella lundbergi (phantom blindcat) is a species of North American freshwater catfish (family Ictaluridae) endemic to Mexico. It is a troglobitic species found in caves of the Tamesi River drainage. This species grows to a length of  SL.

References

lundbergi
Cave fish
Endemic fish of Mexico
Freshwater fish of Mexico
Endangered fish
Endangered biota of Mexico
Fish described in 1995
Taxonomy articles created by Polbot
Pánuco River